Odontoglossum hallii, the Hall's odontoglossum, is a species of orchid found from Colombia to Ecuador.

hallii